Valery Vyacheslavovich Yesipov (born 4 October 1971) is a Russian football manager and a former player. 

Once, Yesipov held the record for most appearances in the Russian Premier League (390), he has been since overtaken by several players. Yesipov has also been capped five times for the Russia national football team.

Honours
 1993 – Russian Top Division runner-up
 1996 – Russian Top Division, third position
 1997 – Russian Top Division runner-up
 1997 – best right midfielder according to Sport-Express
 1998 – best right midfielder according to Sport-Express
 Russian Second Division, Zone Center best manager: 2009.
 Russian Professional Football League Zone Center Best Manager: 2015–16.

References

External links
 Club profile
 RussiaTeam profile 
 
 

1971 births
Living people
People from Shchigry, Kursk Oblast
Soviet footballers
Russian footballers
Association football midfielders
Russia international footballers
Russia under-21 international footballers
Russian expatriate footballers
Expatriate footballers in Ukraine
FC Fakel Voronezh players
FC Dynamo Kyiv players
FC Rotor Volgograd players
FC Saturn Ramenskoye players
Russian Premier League players
Ukrainian Premier League players
Russian expatriate sportspeople in Ukraine
Russian football managers
FC Rotor Volgograd managers
FC Avangard Kursk players
Sportspeople from Kursk Oblast